Charmuguria Eco-Park is a Eco-Park located in Madaripur district of Dhaka division in central Bangladesh.

Location 
The Eco-Park is located in Nayachar area of Kumarakhali mouza in Madaripur Sadar upazila of Madaripur district.

Description 
The area of the Eco-Park is 4.20 hectares. The Eco-Park was established in 2015. Charmuguria is mainly known for monkeys. In 2015, Two to two-and-a-half thousand monkeys live in Charmuguria. The Forest Department set up a sanctuary for monkeys in the Nayachar area for their relocation, although it was not possible to take the monkeys there completely.

References 

Madaripur District
Parks in Bangladesh